The Japanese Journal of Applied Physics is a peer-reviewed scientific journal that was established in 1962 and is published by the Japan Society of Applied Physics. From 1982 until 2008, the journal was published in two editions, Part 1 and Part 2:
 Part 1 was published monthly and was for regular papers, short notes and review papers.
 Part 2 was published semi-monthly and was for letters and express letters.

In 2008, Part 2 was separated as an independent journal and renamed Applied Physics Express. Part 1 continues to be published as the Japanese Journal of Applied Physics.

In June 2013, the Japan Society of Applied Physics signed an agreement with IOP Publishing for its journals to be published by IOP Publishing.

See also
 Applied Physics Express

References

External links
 scope of the Journal
 content of the Journal
 Editorial Policy of the Journal
 The Institute of Pure and Applied Physics

Academic journals of Japan
Physics journals
Publications established in 1962
Monthly journals
English-language journals
Science and technology in Japan
Japan Society of Applied Physics academic journals
IOP Publishing academic journals